The 1990 Swiss Indoors was a men's tennis tournament played on indoor hard courts at the St. Jakobshalle in Basel, Switzerland that was part of the World Series of the 1990 ATP Tour. It was the 21st edition of the tournament and took place from 24 September until 30 September 1990. Third-seeded John McEnroe won the singles title.

Finals

Singles

 John McEnroe defeated  Goran Ivanišević 	6–7(4–7), 4–6, 7–6(7–3), 6–3, 6–4
 It was McEnroe's 1st singles title of the year and the 76th of his career.

Doubles
 Stefan Kruger /  Christo van Rensburg defeated  Neil Broad /  Gary Muller 4–6, 7–6, 6–3

References

External links
 ITF tournament edition profile

Swiss Indoors
Swiss Indoors
1990 in Swiss tennis